"Say Cheese" is the 18th episode of the fifth season of the CBS situation comedy How I Met Your Mother and 106th episode overall. It originally aired on March 22, 2010.

Plot

It is Lily's 32nd birthday, and, as one who really loves her own birthday, she wakes herself up at midnight for the sole purpose of announcing that it is officially her birthday before falling asleep once again. Later in the morning, Marshall brings her breakfast in bed with its own theme, Spanish Interlude, complete with a guitarist and a picture of the "lyrical rolling hills of northern Spain (Alozaina, Málaga)" in the window.

One of Lily's first presents to be opened is a new digital camera with naked pictures of Marshall inside. As she enjoys taking pictures all the time, Barney and Robin cringe as they remember all of the group shots Lily took over the years and the situations that happened before the pictures were taken. Ted arrives at the door with his new girlfriend, Amanda, who has volunteered to bake Lily's cake, which upsets Lily and Marshall.

The group plays parlor games designed to test their knowledge of Lily, but Amanda does not know anything about her. Lily gathers the gang together for their annual group photo while Amanda prepares the birthday cake in the kitchen, in an attempt to take the photo without Amanda. Ted objects, so Lily brings out a photo album showing pictures from past events where Ted has brought his dates along and says that Ted's dates always ruin the occasion. Lily challenges Ted to name them, but he fails to remember a single one. Lily also reminds him of their trip to Paris: It was initially reserved for only her and Marshall, but Ted came along with Karen. Karen and Ted got in a fight and broke up before the plane landed. Karen's presence in Paris ruined the whole trip.

Ted apologizes for always ruining their group shots, but explains that he is always trying to find "The One". Robin admits not inviting Don because some of the gang's important events are not ideal to bring new friends. Ted notes that Robin is Lily's best friend, but she began as one of Ted's "random skanks", Lily countering that Robin is the "skanky exception to the skanky rule". Ted accepts that Amanda does not have to be in the group photo, but asks Lily to give her a chance. When Amanda reveals the birthday cake, which reads "Happy 42nd Birthday, Lori", while Lily is merely amused, Marshall gets angry and kicks Amanda out of the apartment. Marshall explains he has become cynical because every time Ted breaks up with a girl, Marshall is there to pick up the pieces and console the girl.

Ted comments that all of the photos in Lily's photo album show no signs of the fights and disagreements that happened only moments before they were taken. Lily turns the page to the first photo that she, Marshall, and Ted had taken together back in college, a result of Ted inviting her into the picture because he believed that her and Marshall's relationship would last. Lily apologizes to Ted and agrees to call back Amanda.

Robin notices that Barney's pose is exactly the same in all of the photographs. Barney explains that he never takes a bad picture. He compares and contrasts his photo presence with Marshall's; while Barney always looks "drop dead, stone cold amazing", Marshall "just looks dead, stoned, and cold". Robin tries to take candid pictures of Barney, but is shocked to see his usual pose in all the pictures. When the time comes for the group photo, Robin tricks Barney into removing his suit jacket just before the picture is taken, but the finished product shows Barney in his usual pose, much to Robin's dismay.

At Lily's 33rd birthday, Lily asks Ted to identify Amanda in the photo album, but he cannot remember her name. As they gather for the group photo, Robin offers Barney some dip. Barney realizes too late the dip contains cilantro,  which he is allergic to, and begins to sneeze. Finally, Robin catches Barney in a compromising position for a bad photograph.

Critical response
Donna Bowman of The A.V. Club rated the episode a B+.

Amanda Sloane Murray of IGN gave the episode 7.8 out of 10.

Joel Keller of TV Squad was less impressed, describing the episode as "half-baked". He wrote that the main premise needed to be explored further, that the B stories were underdeveloped, and that the episode left him dissatisfied.

Vlada Gelman of the Los Angeles Times enjoyed seeing an episode where the whole group was together in the same room, nicely tied together with flashbacks and flashforwards. Gelman suggests Lily just needs to learn to use the "skank removal tool" in Photoshop.

Alan Sepinwall of The Star-Ledger wrote: "I have to say, though, that the Marshall-with-his-eyes-closed running gag was funnier before the episode started calling attention to it".

References

External links

2010 American television episodes
How I Met Your Mother (season 5) episodes
Television episodes about birthdays